Jordanian Australians refers to Australians of Jordanian descent or a Jordan-born person who resides in Australia. According to Australia's 2011 Census there were a total of 4,621 Jordan-born people in Australia, an increase of 24.2 per cent from the 2006 Census (3,397). The vast majority of Jordanian Australians reside in the state of New South Wales.

Notably immigration from Jordan is one of the most recent in Australia.

Jordan's demography 
The current population of Jordan is steadily increased in the last few decades but faster in the last few years to reach 7,825,208 as of Tuesday, February 7, 2017, based on the latest United Nations estimates. This is about 0.1% Country's Share of World Population putting Jordan on 101 position of the global rank. However, the yearly population growth rate has been reported to reduce from 12% in 1950 to 1.66% at present (2017).

Age and Sex 
The median age of the Jordan-born in 2011 was 36 years compared with 45 years for all overseas-born and 37 years for the total Australian population. The age distribution showed 12.9 per cent were aged 0-14 years, 12.1 per cent were 15-24 years, 39.8 per cent were 25-44 years, 29.4 per cent were 45-64 years and 5.8 per cent were 65 years and over. Of the Jordan-born in Australia, there were 2559 males (55.4 per cent) and 2060 females (44.6 per cent). The sex ratio was 124.2 males per 100 females.

Ancestry 
In the 2011 Census, the top ancestry responses* that Jordan-born people reported were Jordanian (1909), Arab nfd (937) and Palestinian (732). In the 2011 Census, Australians reported around 300 different ancestries. Of the total ancestry responses*, 4218 responses were towards Jordanian ancestry.

At the 2011 Census up to two responses per person were allowed for the Ancestry question; therefore providing the total responses and not persons count.

Language 
The main languages spoken at home by Jordan-born people in Australia were Arabic (3785), English (416) and Armenian (162). Of the 4203 Jordan-born who spoke a language other than English at home, 89 per cent spoke English very well or well, and 10.1 per cent spoke English not well or not at all.

Religion 
At the 2011 Census the major religious affiliations amongst Jordan-born were Islam (2260), Catholic (1020) and Eastern Orthodox (536). Of the Jordan-born, 3.2 per cent stated 'No Religion or Atheist' which was lower than that of the total Australian population (22.3 per cent), and 2.4 per cent did not state a religion.

Arrival 
Compared to 62 per cent of the total overseas-born population, 57.4 per cent of the Jordan-born people in Australia arrived in Australia prior to 2001. Among the total Jordan-born in Australia at the 2011 Census, 19.1 per cent arrived between 2001 and 2006 and 19.3 per cent arrived between 2007 and 2011.

Median Income 
At the time of the 2011 Census, the median individual weekly income for the Jordan-born in Australia aged 15 years and over was $384, compared with $538 for all overseas-born and $597 for all Australia-born. The total Australian population had a median individual weekly income of $577.

Qualifications 
At the 2011 Census, 60.4 per cent of the Jordan-born aged 15 years and over had some form of higher non-school qualifications compared to 55.9 per cent of the Australian population. Of the Jordan-born aged 15 years and over, 9.7 per cent were still attending an educational institution. The corresponding rate for the total Australian population was 8.6 per cent.

Employment 
Among Jordan-born people aged 15 years and over, the participation rate in the labour force was 56.6 per cent and the unemployment rate was 11.8 per cent. The corresponding rates in the total Australian population were 65 per cent and 5.6 per cent respectively. Of the 1974 Jordan-born who were employed, 51.4 per cent were employed in either a skilled managerial, professional or trade occupation. The corresponding rate in the total Australian population was 48.4 per cent.

Embassy of the Hashemite Kingdom of Jordan in Australia 

17 Cobbadah Street
O’Malley, ACT 2606
AUSTRALIA

Embassy of Australia in Jordan 
41 Kayed Al-Armoti Street
Abdoun Al-Janoubi
Amman Jordan

Mailing Address:
Australian Embassy
P.O.Box 35201
Amman 11180 Jordan

See also 
 Arab Australians
 Jordanian people
Assyrian Australians

References 

Australia